Jason Crest (formerly The Good Thing Brigade) were an English, Tonbridge, Kent based psychedelic pop group, active from around 1967 to 1969. Despite releasing five singles on Philips from 1967 to 1968, (including a cover of the Move's "(Here We Go Round) The Lemon Tree"), the band were never commercially successful and disbanded towards the end of the 1960s when their contract with Philips expired.

However, the singles "Black Mass", "Turquoise Tandem Cycle", "(Here We Go Round) The Lemon Tree" and "Place in the Sun" have all appeared on the Rubble collection of British psychedelia and freakbeat, and the band garnered a modest cult reputation.

Jason Crest's fourth single, "Waterloo Road" (1968), was adapted into French as "Les Champs-Élysées" by singer Joe Dassin and reached number one in France.

Band members

Terry Clarke (vocals)
Terry Dobson (lead guitar)
Derek Smallcombe (rhythm guitar)
Ron Fowler (bass)  (replaced by John Selley after third single)
Roger Siggery (drums)

Discography

Singles
"Turquoise Tandem Cycle" / "Good Life" (Philips BF 1633)
"Juliano the Bull" / "Two by the Sea" (Philips BF 1650)
"(Here We Go Round) The Lemon Tree" (Roy Wood) / "Patricia's Dream" (Philips BF 1687)
"Waterloo Road" / "Education" (Philips BF 1752)
"Place in the Sun" / "Black Mass" (Philips BF 1809)

Compilation albums
 The Collected Works of Jason Crest (Wooden Hill WHCD006) – CD only
 Radio Sessions (Tenth Planet TP 041) – Vinyl only

External links
Jason Crest at Marmalade Skies

English psychedelic rock music groups
Musical groups established in 1967